Jutial is a developed residential scheme project in the city of Gilgit of Gilgit-Baltistan province in Pakistan, a new city neighborhood with a large population.

It is divided into sectors and sub-sectors. It contains the Gilgit-Baltistan Legislative Assembly, Gilgit-Baltistan Secretariat, FCNA (Force Commandar Northern Areas. Also the Serena Hotel is located in Jutial

External links
For more Information and Pictures of Jutial

 Neighbourhoods in Pakistan
Gilgit